The 1987 Big South Conference baseball tournament was the postseason baseball tournament for the Big South Conference, held from May 14 through 16 at Taylor Field on the campus of Campbell University in Buies Creek, North Carolina. Four teams participated in the double-elimination tournament. The Big South played the season at the NCAA Division I level, but did not receive an automatic bid to the 1987 NCAA Division I baseball tournament.  won the championship for the second time out of three years of the Tournament's existence.

Format 
The top four finishers from the regular season qualified for the tournament.

Bracket and results

All-Tournament Team

Most Valuable Player 
Mike Michener was named Tournament Most Valuable Player. Michener was an outfielder for Armstrong State.

References 

Tournament
Big South Conference Baseball Tournament
Big South baseball tournament
Big South Conference baseball tournament